Benjamin Wofford (1780-1850) was a Methodist minister who was a co-founder and the namesake of Wofford College in South Carolina in the United States.

Early life
Benjamin Wofford was born on October 19, 1780, to Joseph and Martha Wofford and was named after his Loyalist uncle. Wofford's father, a supporter of the American Patriot cause, was supposedly captured on the night of Wofford's birth during the American Revolution, but was freed by Martha Wofford's pleading. Under his mother's Christian mentorship, Wofford became a Christian.

Career
Wofford was ordained as a Methodist preacher, going on to preach in Kentucky, Tennessee, and South Carolina. By 1807, he ran a farm and continued preaching locally in South Carolina.

Wofford became involved in banking and other investments in the region. Wofford was a co-founder of Central Methodist Church in Spartanburg in 1837. Wofford was involved in various church charitable causes, including donating to Randolph-Macon College in Virginia during the 1830s.

Personal life
Wofford married Anna Todd, the only child from a wealthy Spartanburg family, in 1807. The Woffords had no children. His wife died on October 2, 1835, at age 51. On September 6, 1836, Wofford married Maria Scott Barron, a wealthy woman from East Tennessee who was 23 years younger than Wofford. Wofford also owned slaves.

Death and legacy
Wofford died in 1850 and left a will donating $100,000 for the creation of a college, which eventually became Wofford College, requesting the creation of a school "literary, classical, and scientific education in my native district of Spartanburg.".

References

External links
Official Biography

1780 births
1850 deaths
American philanthropists
Wofford College
University and college founders
People from Spartanburg, South Carolina
Methodists from South Carolina
American slave owners